This is a demography of the population of Paraguay including population density, ethnicity, education level, health of the populace, economic status, religious affiliations and other aspects of the population.

Characteristics

Paraguay's population is distributed unevenly through the country. The vast majority of the people live in the eastern region, most within  of Asunción, the capital and largest city, which borders on Argentina to the south and west. The Gran Chaco in the north-west, which accounts for about 60% of Paraguayan territory, is home to less than 2% of the population. The Paraguay government encouraged massive settlement of the vast Gran Chaco.

Ethnically, culturally, and socially, Paraguay has one of the most homogeneous populations in South America. About 75% of the people are mestizo (mixed Spanish and Guaraní Native American descent), 20% are Whites, and the rest are small minorities of Indigenous or Afro Paraguayan origin. Little trace is left of the original Guaraní culture except the language, which is spoken by 90% of the population. About 75% of all Paraguayans also speak Spanish. Guaraní and Spanish are official languages.

Paraguay has a history of foreign settlement, especially in the 20th century: Germans (the majority are Mennonites) with long-time Paraguayan dictator Alfredo Stroessner (President, 1954-1989) himself of German ancestry; Italians (around 40% of the total Paraguayan population is of full or partial Italian descent); Japanese with Okinawans; Koreans; Chinese; Arabs, Ukrainians; Poles; Southern Europeans; Jews; Brazilians; and Argentines are among those who have settled in Paraguay. There are also an estimated 234,000 Afro-Paraguayans, or 4% of the population.

European and Middle Eastern immigrants began making their way to Paraguay in the decades following the Paraguayan War of 1864-1870 (from 1870 onward). Only 28,000 men and 200,000 women had survived the war, the reason why Paraguay had since then a high rate of illegitimate births. The government pursued a pro-immigration policy in an effort to increase population. Government records indicated that approximately 12,000 immigrants entered the port of Asunción between 1882 and 1907, of that total, almost 9,000 came from Italy, Germany, France, and Spain. Migrants also arrived from neighboring Spanish American countries, especially Argentina. The immigrant ethnic groups kept their cultures and languages to some extent, especially Brazilians - known as "Brasiguayos".

Official records gave an imprecise sense of the number of Brazilians who came to the country. According to the 1982 census, 99,000 Brazilians resided in Paraguay. Most analysts discounted this figure, however, and contended that between 300,000 and 350,000 Brazilians lived in the eastern border region.

Analysts also rejected government figures on the number of immigrants from South Korea, Hong Kong and Taiwan. The 1982 census reported that there were 2,700 Koreans in Paraguay, along with another 1,100 non-Japanese or non-Korean Asian immigrants. Virtually all Koreans and Chinese lived in Ciudad del Este or Asunción and played a major role in the importation and sale of electronic goods manufactured in Asia.

Paraguay became the site of radical and progressive colonies inspired by political thinkers of the late 19th and early 20th centuries. A group of radical socialist Australians in the 1890s voluntarily went to create a failed master-planned community, known as Nueva (New) Australia (1893 -1897); and Elisabeth Nietzsche, a German racial ideologist and sister of philosopher Friedrich Nietzsche came to Paraguay in her attempt to build a colony, Nueva Germania (Neues Deutschland) (founded 1886) devoted to a hypothetical pure white "Nordic" society.

Population

The proportion of children below the age of 15 in 2010 was 33.5%, 61.4% was between 15 and 65 years of age, while 5.1% was 65 years or older
.

Structure of the population 
Structure of the population per 1 July 2013. Projections are based on the 2002 Population Census.

Vital statistics
Registration of vital events in Paraguay are not complete. The Population Department of the United Nations prepared the following estimates.

Births and deaths

Deaths from January – October 2021 =  47,730
Deaths from January – October 2022 =  33,794

Total fertility rate

Total Fertility Rate (Wanted Fertility Rate):

Ethnic groups

Religions

Languages

CIA World Factbook demographic statistics 
The following demographic statistics are from the CIA World Factbook, unless otherwise indicated.

Age structure
 0–14 years: 23.41% (male 857,303/female 826,470)
 15–24 years: 17.71% (male 640,400/female 633,525)
 25–54 years: 42.63% (male 1,532,692/female 1,532,851)
 55–64 years: 8.37% (male 306,100/female 295,890)
 65 years and over: 7.88% (male 267,351/female 299,103) (2020 est.)

Dependency ratios
total dependency ratio: 55.5
 youth dependency ratio: 49.9
 elderly dependency ratio: 10.6
 potential support ratio: 9.4 (2020 est.)

Median age
 total: 29.7 years
 male: 29.5 years
 female: 29.9 years (2020 est.)

Population growth rate
 1.15% (2021 est.)

Sex ratio
 at birth: 1.05 male(s)/female
 0–14 years: 1.04 male(s)/female
 15–24 years: 1.01 male(s)/female
 25–54 years: 1 male(s)/female
 55–64 years: 1.03 male(s)/female
 65 years and over: 0.89 male(s)/female
 total population: 1 male(s)/female (2020 est.)

HIV/AIDS – adult prevalence rate
0.3% (2020 est.)

HIV/AIDS – people living with HIV/AIDS
19,000 (2020 est.)

HIV/AIDS – deaths
<500 (2020 est.)

Literacy
 definition: age 15 and over can read and write
 total population: 94%
 male: 94.5%
 female: 93.5% (2018 est.)

References